Torymus tubicola is a species of chalcid wasp in the family Torymidae.

References

Further reading

External links

 

Parasitic wasps
Insects described in 1870
Chalcidoidea